Sahara is the eighth album by American Jazz group The Rippingtons, released in 1994 on the GRP label. The album reached number two on Billboard's contemporary Jazz chart. It is also the first of two studio albums to be released under the name Russ Freeman & The Rippingtons, with the next being Brave New World.

Track listing
All tracks written by Russ Freeman except where noted.
"Native Sons of a Distant Land" – 4:47
"True Companion" – 4:26
"I'll Be Around" (Phil Murtt, Thomas Bell) – 4:04
"Principles of Desire" – 4:41
"Sahara" – 5:01
"'Til We're Together Again" – 5:17
"The Best Is Yet to Come" – 4:59
"Journey's End" – 3:13
"Girl With the Indigo Eyes" – 4:49
"Porscha" – 4:49

Personnel 

The Rippingtons
 Russ Freeman – keyboards, guitars, rhythm programming, mandolin (2), bass (2, 3, 4, 8)
 Kim Stone – bass (1, 5, 6, 7, 9, 10)
 Tony Morales – drums (1, 2, 5, 6, 7, 9, 10)
 Steve Reid – percussion (1, 2, 5, 7, 10)
 Jeff Kashiwa – tenor saxophone (1, 10), EWI controller (1), alto saxophone (5, 10), soprano saxophone (8, 9)
 Tom McMorran – acoustic piano (2, 7), acoustic piano solo (2, 7), additional keyboards (7) [uncredited in 6]

Guest Musicians and Vocalists
 Art Wood – loops (3, 4, 9)
 Kirk Whalum – tenor saxophone (3, 4)
 Jeffrey Osborne – lead vocals (3)
 Bridgette Bryant – backing vocals (3, 4)
 Lynne Fiddmont – backing vocals (3, 4)
 Jim Gilstrap – backing vocals (3, 4)
 Phil Perry – backing vocals (3, 4), lead vocals (4)

Production 
 Russ Freeman – producer, arrangements, recording, mixing 
 Dave Grusin – executive producer
 Larry Rosen – executive producer
 John Potoker – recording (Jeffrey Osborne's vocal on Track 3)
 Carl Griffin – mixing 
 Joseph Doughney – post-production engineer
 Michael Landy – post-production engineer
 Vlado Meller – mastering 
 Cara Bridgins – production coordinator 
 Joseph Moore – production coordination assistant 
 Sonny Mediana – production director
 Lillian Barbuti – production direction assistant 
 Andi Howard – album coordination, management 
 Andy Baltimore – creative director
 Alba Acevedo – art direction, inside illustration 
 Hollis King – art direction 
 Dan Serrano – art direction 
 Laurie Goldman – graphic design 
 Freddie Paloma – graphic design 
 Bill Mayer – cover illustration
 Carl Studna – photography

Studios
 Recorded and Mixed at Cheyenne Mountain Ranch Studios (Colorado).
 Additional recording at Ameraycan Studios and The Slam Shack (North Hollywood, California).
 Post-Production recording at The Review Room (New York City, New York).
 Mastered at Sony Music Studios (New York City, New York).

Charts

References

External links
The Rippingtons-Sahara at Discogs
The Rippingtons-Sahara at AllMusic
The Rippingtons Official Website

1994 albums
GRP Records albums
The Rippingtons albums